The Secretariat of the Treasury and Public Credit (SHCP) is the finance ministry of Mexico. The Secretary of the Treasury is the head of the department, and is a member of the federal executive cabinet, appointed to the post by the President of the Republic, with the approval of the Chamber of Deputies. Recently, the institution has been promoting a financial inclusion policy and is now a member of the Alliance for Financial Inclusion.  This position is analogous to the Secretary of the Treasury in the United States of America or to the finance ministers of other nations.

Proposes and directs the Federal Government’s economic policy as regards finances, tax, spending, income and public debt and statistics, geography and information, in order to ensure quality, equitable, inclusive and sustained economic growth.

Mexican Customs Bureau (Administración General de Aduanas) is part of the Mexican Tax Administration Service, the government body entrusted with the collection of taxes at the national level. Both departments answer to the Treasurer.

List of secretaries

Sources

External links 
Official Website of Finance and Public Credit
Official site of the President's Cabinet

Mexico
Finance

Mexico
Finance in Mexico
Finance